German submarine U-1056 was a Type VIIC U-boat of Nazi Germany's Kriegsmarine during World War II.

She was ordered on 5 June 1941, and was laid down on 21 June 1943 at Friedrich Krupp Germaniawerft AG, Kiel, as yard number 690. She was launched on 30 March 1944 and commissioned under the command of Oberleutnant zur See Rudolf Schwarz on 29 April 1944.

Design
German Type VIIC submarines were preceded by the shorter Type VIIB submarines. U-1056 had a displacement of  when at the surface and  while submerged. She had two shafts and two  propellers.

U-1056 was fitted with five  torpedo tubes (four fitted at the bow and one at the stern), fourteen torpedoes or 26 TMA mines, one  SK C/35 naval gun, (220 rounds), one  Flak M42 and two twin  C/30 anti-aircraft guns. The boat had a complement of between 44 — 52 men.

Service history
U-1056 was scuttled near Gelting in Gelting Bay on 5 May 1945 as part of Operation Regenbogen. Her wreck was raised and broken.

References

Bibliography

External links

German Type VIIC submarines
U-boats commissioned in 1944
World War II submarines of Germany
Ships built in Kiel
1943 ships
Operation Regenbogen (U-boat)
Maritime incidents in May 1945